Bordesley railway station is a small railway station serving the area of Bordesley in Birmingham, England located between Birmingham Moor Street and Small Heath stations. The current minimal level of service at the station is provided by West Midlands Trains services between Birmingham Snow Hill and Stratford-upon-Avon. The station is the least used in the West Midlands county with only 10,038 passengers using it annually.

The single island platform is above street level, as the railway line here is on a viaduct. The only public access is from Coventry Road, directly underneath the railway bridge.

History
Bordesley station was opened in 1855 by the Great Western Railway on their main line from London (Paddington) to Birkenhead (Woodside). It was originally a two platform station, but was rebuilt as a four platform station with two island platforms when the line was upgraded to four tracks during 1915. The station once had extensive cattle sidings adjacent to and on Duddeston Viaduct.  This viaduct was intended to link the line from Bordesley to the Derby Line but was left incomplete when it was realised that trains would be unable to serve Birmingham Curzon Street railway station, where rail services then terminated.

The station still carries the painted lettering "BR(W) Bordesley Cattle Station", and "Bordesley Cattle Station GWR" from the time when, as part of the Great Western Railway and later British Rail's (Western) region, it was used to bring cattle from the countryside to the Bull Ring markets.

The station was downgraded in the 1960s to minimal facilities and services, and one island platform was taken out of use.

Services
Since May 2007, the station has been served by a single weekly parliamentary train in one direction only.

The station primarily serves as a match day stop for nearby St Andrew's stadium of Birmingham City Football Club, and additional services stop there when there are home fixtures.

References

External links

History of the station with old photos
Descriptive tour with modern photos

Railway stations in Birmingham, West Midlands
DfT Category F2 stations
Former Great Western Railway stations
Railway stations in Great Britain opened in 1855
Railway stations in Great Britain closed in 1915
Railway stations in Great Britain opened in 1915
Railway stations served by West Midlands Trains